Conway Peak is an ice-free peak which rises to  between the foot of Wreath Valley and Albert Valley in the Apocalypse Peaks of Victoria Land. Named in 2005 by the Advisory Committee on Antarctic Names after Maurice Conway of Thames, New Zealand; field guide in eight summer seasons for German expeditions to Victoria Land, Marie Byrd Land and Queen Maud Land, 1979–2000; field guide/technician in six seasons, 1997-2004 for the United States Antarctic Program at Roosevelt Island and West Marie Byrd Land ice streams.

References

Mountains of Victoria Land